Alessandro Farnese (10 January 1635 – 18 February 1689) was an Italian military leader, who was Governor of the Habsburg Netherlands from 1678 until 1682.

He is not to be confused with his better known great-grandfather Alexander Farnese, Duke of Parma. This Alessandro was often called Alessandro di Odoardo (son of Odoardo).

His title was Prince of Parma. His elder brother Ranuccio II was the sixth Duke of Parma and Piacenza .

Biography
He was born in Parma, the second son of Odoardo Farnese, fifth Duke of Parma, and Margherita de' Medici.

He was general in the army of Venice, fighting the Turks and later admiral in the Spanish Navy.

He became governor of the Southern Netherlands after the Franco-Dutch War.

Alexander died in Madrid in 1689.

Family
By his mistress Maria de Lao y Carillo had the following children:
 Alessandro Odoardo (Badajoz, 12 April 1663 – Cacéres, 21 May 1666)
 Alessandro Maria (Badajoz, 30 October 1664 – 28 September 1726), Colonel in Spanish army
 Margherita (Badajoz, 5 June 1665 – Parma, November 1718), nun in Parma
 Isabella (Badajoz, 19 September 1666 – Parma, 27 December 1741), nun in Parma

References

1635 births
1689 deaths
Military personnel from Parma
Alexander
Governors of the Habsburg Netherlands
Viceroys of Navarre
Viceroys of Catalonia
Knights of the Golden Fleece
Republic of Venice military personnel
Spanish admirals
17th-century Italian nobility
Nobility from Parma
Sons of monarchs